In taxonomy, the Caldisphaeraceae are a family of the Acidilobales.

Phylogeny
The currently accepted taxonomy is based on the List of Prokaryotic names with Standing in Nomenclature (LPSN)  and National Center for Biotechnology Information (NCBI)

References

Further reading

Scientific journals

Scientific books

Scientific databases

External links

Archaea taxonomic families
Thermoproteota